The EuroCup Basketball Awards are the awards given to the top individual performers of each season's edition of EuroCup Basketball, which is Europe's second-tier level continental-wide professional club basketball competition. The EuroCup is the league level that is one tier below the EuroLeague level.

EuroCup awards
The awards are given out each season and include: the EuroCup Basketball MVP award, the EuroCup Basketball Finals MVP award, the EuroCup Basketball Regular Season MVP award, the EuroCup Basketball Rising Star award, the EuroCup Basketball Coach of the Year award, and the EuroCup Basketball All-EuroCup Team.

EuroCup Basketball MVP

The EuroCup Basketball MVP award began with the 2008–09 season.

 There was no awarding in the 2019–20, because the season was cancelled due to the coronavirus pandemic in Europe.

EuroCup Basketball Finals MVP

The EuroCup Basketball Finals MVP award began with the 2002–03 season.

 There was no awarding in the 2019–20, because the season was cancelled due to the coronavirus pandemic in Europe.

EuroCup Basketball Regular Season MVP

The EuroCup Basketball Regular Season MVP award began with the 2017–18 season.

EuroCup Basketball MVP of the Week

The EuroCup Basketball MVP of the Week award began with the 2002–03 season.

EuroCup Basketball Top Scorer

EuroCup Basketball Rising Star

The EuroCup Basketball Rising Star award began with the 2008–09 season.

 There was no awarding in the 2019–20, because the season was cancelled due to the coronavirus pandemic in Europe.

EuroCup Basketball Coach of the Year

The EuroCup Basketball Coach of the Year award began with the 2008–09 season.

 There was no awarding in the 2019–20, because the season was cancelled due to the coronavirus pandemic in Europe.

EuroCup Basketball All-EuroCup Team

The EuroCup Basketball All-EuroCup Team awards began with the 2008–09 season.

For a listing of all of the All-EuroCup Teams,

See also
EuroLeague Awards (top-tier level)
Basketball Champions League Awards (third-tier level)

References

External links
EuroCup Basketball Official Web Page

Awards
European basketball awards